Mohamed Ayman Ouhatti (born 15 January 2000) is a Moroccan professional footballer who plays as a midfielder for the Luxembourger club UT Pétange.

Professional career
Ouhatti joined the youth academy of Amiens in 2019 from the Mohammed VI Football Academy. He made his professional debut with Amiens in a 3–1 Ligue 2 win over Valenciennes FC on 20 April 2021.

On 13 July 2021, he joined Orléans on loan.

International career
Ouhati was on the final list to participate in the 2020 UNAF U-20 Tournament qualifying for the 2021 Africa U-20 Cup of Nations and participated in all matches. Ouhatti represented the Morocco U20s at the 2021 Africa U-20 Cup of Nations.

Honours 
Morocco U18
 UNAF U-18 Tournament: 2019

Morocco U20
 UNAF U-20 Tournament: 2020

References

External links
 

2000 births
Footballers from Rabat
Living people
Moroccan footballers
Morocco youth international footballers
Association football midfielders
Amiens SC players
US Orléans players
Union Titus Pétange players
Ligue 2 players
Championnat National 3 players
Luxembourg National Division players
Moroccan expatriate footballers
Moroccan expatriate sportspeople in France
Expatriate footballers in France
Moroccan expatriate sportspeople in Luxembourg
Expatriate footballers in Luxembourg